Karel Otáhal (19 January 1901 – 23 August 1972) was a Czech sculptor. His work was part of the sculpture event in the art competition at the 1948 Summer Olympics.

References

1901 births
1972 deaths
20th-century Czech sculptors
20th-century male artists
Czech male sculptors
Olympic competitors in art competitions
People from Prostějov District